Four Girls in Town is a 1957 American CinemaScope Technicolor drama film, directed by Jack Sher, about four girls trying to be movie stars.

Plot
When the leading lady drops out of a new film to be shot in New Orleans, studio head James Manning seeks an unknown actress to be his new star. He finds four leading candidates and employs aspiring director Mike Snowden to conduct their screen tests.

The young women come from all walks of life. Kathy Conway is a Minnesota girl who agrees to try acting to please her mother. Ina Schiller is from Vienna, where she was recently widowed. Vicki Dauray comes from Paris, where she leaves behind a husband and child. Maria Antonelli is a beauty from Italy whose talent is mainly in alluring men.

Kathy takes a personal interest in Mike, but is disappointed when he leaves a party with Ina instead. Handsome actor Tom Grant is interested in Vicki and publicist Ted Larabee promotes her, neither aware that she is a married woman. Ina is introduced to Mike's moody composer friend Johnny Pryor, while Maria is seduced by Spencer Farrington, Jr., a playboy hotelier.

Kathy's mother turns up and expects everyone to recognize her daughter as a future star. Kathy fails her screen test, but realizes Mike wants to pursue a personal relationship with her. The original actress changes her mind and takes back the film role, but the studio offers Ina and Maria movie contracts, and marriage contracts with their new suitors. Vicki is not disappointed, realizing that her family comes first.

Cast
George Nader as Mike Snowden
Julie Adams as Kathy Conway
Marianne Cook (Marianne Koch) as Ina Schiller
Elsa Martinelli as Maria Antonelli
Gia Scala as Vicki Dauray
Sydney Chaplin as Johnny Pryor
Grant Williams as Spencer Farrington, Jr.
John Gavin as Tom Grant
Herbert Anderson as Ted Larabee
Hy Averback as Bob Trapp
Ainslie Pryor as James Manning
Judson Pratt as William Purdy

See also
 List of American films of 1957

References

External links

Review of film at New York Times

1957 films
1957 drama films
American drama films
Films scored by Alex North
Films about actors
Universal Pictures films
Films directed by Jack Sher
Films with screenplays by Jack Sher
1950s English-language films
1950s American films